"1-2-3" (sometimes listed as "1, 2, 3") is a 1988 song by American singer and songwriter Gloria Estefan and the Miami Sound Machine. The song was written by the band's drummer and lead songwriter Enrique "Kiki" Garcia along with Estefan and appears on the multi-platinum album Let It Loose. The music video was directed by Jim Yukich and produced by Paul Flattery.

Released as the fifth and final single from that album in the late summer of 1988, "1-2-3" peaked at #3 on the Billboard Hot 100 chart in July 1988, and was the band's seventh Top 10-hit. It became the band's seventh Top 10 hit in the US. In addition, the song became their fourth #1 hit on the Billboard adult contemporary chart. On the Billboard R&B chart, "1-2-3" peaked at 54, and on the UK Singles Chart it peaked at #9. After the success of the re-releases of "Can't Stay Away From You" and "Anything For You", 1,2,3 also saw a re-release outside the US in January 1989. The single release was remixed to add more horns, a stronger rhythm track, and a different intro to the song; this version was issued on Gloria Estefan Greatest Hits and The Essential Gloria Estefan.

The lyrics of "1-2-3" detail the singer's desire to have a shy suitor approach her.

In 1991, Estefan sang a children's rendition of the song with Big Bird and the Birdketeers on Sesame Street.

Official versions
Original versions
 Album Version — (3:28)

Eric Schilling & John Haag remixes
 Remix — (3:36)
 Remix Instrumental (aka Instrumental Version) — (3:36)
 Extended Version — (4:42)
 Dub Mix — (4:44)

Pete Hammond remixes
 The Dancing By Numbers Mix — (6:27)

Chart performance

Weekly charts

Year-end charts

Formats and track listings

Release history

References

1987 songs
1988 singles
Gloria Estefan songs
Songs written by Gloria Estefan
Songs written by Enrique Garcia (songwriter)
Song recordings produced by Emilio Estefan
Epic Records singles